The Small Magellanic Cloud (SMC), or Nubecula Minor, is a dwarf galaxy near the Milky Way. It has a total mass of approximately 7 billion solar masses. At a distance of about 200,000 light-years, the SMC is among the nearest intergalactic neighbors of the Milky Way and is one of the most distant objects visible to the naked eye.

The SMC is visible from the entire Southern Hemisphere, but can be fully glimpsed low above the southern horizon from latitudes south of about 15° north. The galaxy is located across both the constellations of Tucana and part of Hydrus, appearing as a faint hazy patch resembling a detached piece of the Milky Way. The SMC has an average apparent diameter of about 4.2° (8 times the Moon's) and thus covers an area of about 14 square degrees (70 times the Moon's). Since its surface brightness is very low, this deep-sky object is best seen on clear moonless nights and away from city lights. The SMC forms a pair with the Large Magellanic Cloud (LMC), which lies 20° to the east, and like the LMC, it is a member of the Local Group. It is currently a satellite of the Milky Way, but is likely a former satellite of the LMC.

Observation history

In the southern hemisphere, the Magellanic clouds have long been included in the lore of native inhabitants, including south sea islanders and indigenous Australians. Persian astronomer Al Sufi labelled the larger of the two clouds as Al Bakr, the White Ox. European sailors may have first noticed the clouds during the Middle Ages when they were used for navigation. Portuguese and Dutch sailors called them the Cape Clouds, a name that was retained for several centuries. During the circumnavigation of the Earth by Ferdinand Magellan in 1519–22, they were described by Antonio Pigafetta as dim clusters of stars. In Johann Bayer's celestial atlas Uranometria, published in 1603, he named the smaller cloud, Nubecula Minor. In Latin, Nubecula means a little cloud.

Between 1834 and 1838, John Frederick William Herschel made observations of the southern skies with his  reflector from the Royal Observatory. While observing the Nubecula Minor, he described it as a cloudy mass of light with an oval shape and a bright center. Within the area of this cloud he catalogued a concentration of 37 nebulae and clusters.

In 1891, Harvard College Observatory opened an observing station at Arequipa in Peru. Between 1893 and 1906, under the direction of Solon Bailey, the  telescope at this site was used to survey photographically both the Large and Small Magellanic Clouds. Henrietta Swan Leavitt, an astronomer at the Harvard College Observatory, used the plates from Arequipa to study the variations in relative luminosity of stars in the SMC. In 1908, the results of her study were published, which showed that a type of variable star called a "cluster variable", later called a Cepheid variable after the prototype star Delta Cephei, showed a definite relationship between the variability period and the star's apparent brightness. Leavitt realized that since all the stars in the SMC are roughly the same distance from Earth, this result implied that there is similar relationship between period and absolute brightness. This important period-luminosity relation allowed the distance to any other cepheid variable to be estimated in terms of the distance to the SMC. She hoped a few Cepheid variables could be found close enough to Earth so that their parallax, and hence distance from Earth, could be measured. This soon happened, allowing Cepheid variables to be used as standard candles, facilitating many astronomical discoveries.

Using this period-luminosity relation, in 1913 the distance to the SMC was first estimated by Ejnar Hertzsprung. First he measured thirteen nearby cepheid variables to find the absolute magnitude of a variable with a period of one day. By comparing this to the periodicity of the variables as measured by Leavitt, he was able to estimate a distance of 10,000 parsecs (30,000 light years) between the Sun and the SMC. This later proved to be a gross underestimate of the true distance, but it did demonstrate the potential usefulness of this technique.

Announced in 2006, measurements with the Hubble Space Telescope suggest the Large and Small Magellanic Clouds may be moving too fast to be orbiting the Milky Way.

Features 

The SMC contains a central bar structure, and astronomers speculate that it was once a barred spiral galaxy that was disrupted by the Milky Way to become somewhat irregular.

There is a bridge of gas connecting the Small Magellanic Cloud with the Large Magellanic Cloud (LMC), which is evidence of tidal interaction between the galaxies. The Magellanic Clouds have a common envelope of neutral hydrogen indicating they have been gravitationally bound for a long time. This bridge of gas is a star-forming site.

In 2017, using Dark Energy Survey plus MagLiteS data, a stellar over-density associated with the Small Magellanic Cloud was discovered, which is probably the result of interactions between the SMC and LMC.

X-ray sources
The Small Magellanic Cloud contains a large and active population of X-ray binaries. Recent star formation has led to a large population of massive stars and high-mass X-ray binaries (HMXBs) which are the relics of the short-lived upper end of the initial mass function. The young stellar population and the majority of the known X-ray binaries are concentrated in the SMC's Bar.
HMXB pulsars are rotating neutron stars in binary systems with Be-type (spectral type 09-B2, luminosity classes V–III) or supergiant stellar companions. Most HMXBs are of the Be type which account for 70% in the Milky Way and 98% in the SMC. The Be-star equatorial disk provides a reservoir of matter that can be accreted onto the neutron star during periastron passage (most known systems have large orbital eccentricity) or during large-scale disk ejection episodes. This scenario leads to strings of X-ray outbursts with typical X-ray luminosities Lx = 1036–1037 erg/s, spaced at the orbital period, plus infrequent giant outbursts of greater duration and luminosity.

Monitoring surveys of the SMC performed with NASA's Rossi X-ray Timing Explorer (RXTE) see X-ray pulsars in outburst at more than 1036 erg/s and have counted 50 by the end of 2008. The ROSAT and ASCA missions detected many faint X-ray point sources, but the typical positional uncertainties frequently made positive identification difficult. Recent studies using XMM-Newton and Chandra have now cataloged several hundred X-ray sources in the direction of the SMC, of which perhaps half are considered likely HMXBs, and the remainder a mix of foreground stars, and background AGN.

No X-rays above background were observed from the Magellanic Clouds during the September 20, 1966, Nike-Tomahawk flight. Balloon observation from Mildura, Australia, on October 24, 1967, of the SMC set an upper limit of X-ray detection. An X-ray astronomy instrument was carried aboard a Thor missile launched from Johnston Atoll on September 24, 1970, at 12:54 UTC for altitudes above 300 km, to search for the Small Magellanic Cloud. The SMC was detected with an X-ray luminosity of 5 erg/s in the range 1.5–12 keV, and 2.5 erg/s in the range 5–50 keV for an apparently extended source.

The fourth Uhuru catalog lists an early X-ray source within the constellation Tucana: 4U 0115-73 (3U 0115-73, 2A 0116-737, SMC X-1). Uhuru observed the SMC on January 1, 12, 13, 16, and 17, 1971, and detected one source located at 01149-7342, which was then designated SMC X-1. Some X-ray counts were also received on January 14, 15, 18, and 19, 1971. The third Ariel 5 catalog (3A) also contains this early X-ray source within Tucana: 3A 0116-736 (2A 0116-737, SMC X-1). The SMC X-1, a HMXRB, is at J2000 right ascension (RA)  declination (Dec) .

Two additional sources detected and listed in 3A include SMC X-2 at 3A 0042-738 and SMC X-3 at 3A 0049-726.

Mini Magellanic Cloud (MMC)
It has been proposed by astrophysicists D. S. Mathewson, V. L. Ford and N. Visvanathan that the SMC may in fact be split in two, with a smaller section of this galaxy behind the main part of the SMC (as seen from Earth perspective), and separated by about 30,000 ly. They suggest the reason for this is due to a past interaction with the LMC splitting the SMC, and that the two sections are still moving apart. They have dubbed this smaller remnant the Mini Magellanic Cloud.

See also
Large Magellanic Cloud
Magellanic Clouds
 Objects within the Small Magellanic Cloud:
 NGC 265
 NGC 290
 NGC 346
 NGC 602

References

External links

NASA Extragalactic Database entry on the SMC
SEDS entry on the SMC
SMC at ESA/Hubble 
Astronomy Picture of the Day 2010 January 7 The Tail of the Small Magellanic Cloud - Likely stripped from the galaxy by gravitational tides, the tail contains mostly gas, dust, and newly formed stars.
 A stellar over-density associated with the Small Magellanic Cloud

 
Dwarf barred irregular galaxies
Peculiar galaxies
Low surface brightness galaxies
Milky Way Subgroup
Tucana (constellation)
NGC objects
03085
Astronomical objects known since antiquity
Magellanic Clouds
Local Group